Ozarba corniculans is a moth of the family Noctuidae. The species was first described by Hans Daniel Johan Wallengren in 1860. It is found in Kenya, Zimbabwe, South Africa and Madagascar.

References

External links
 "Erastria corniculans Wallengren, 1860". Swedish Museum of Natural History. With an image of the type.
 With images.

Acontiinae
Lepidoptera of Kenya
Lepidoptera of South Africa
Lepidoptera of Zimbabwe
Moths of Madagascar
Moths of Sub-Saharan Africa
Moths described in 1860